The Devil's Half-Acre is a parcel of land in Solebury Township in Bucks County, Pennsylvania. It is along the Pennsylvania Canal with an incredible view on the Delaware River where a summer community and water sports are particularly popular here.

Location
Heading north from New Hope and Lumberville on Route 32, which tracks the Delaware River, The Devil's Half-Acre is on the right-hand side between the river and the Pennsylvania Canal. It is just south of Dark Hollow Road and Ringing Rocks Park a mile south of Old Ferry Road from Point Pleasant, Pennsylvania.

History
The sole building that exists on The Devil's Half-Acre is a tavern that was built in 1800 when the Pennsylvania Canal was being dug. It is mentioned in the reports of the Delaware Division Canal superintendents (1828–1832).

There is a tradition that during and before the building of the canal the old stone dwelling was occupied by two families. Whiskey was sold without a license and the place became the scene of drunken revelry, and it thus obtained its name.

In 1845 the place came into the possession of Stephen Durand, who was a different type from the former occupants, and still later was the home of a former member of the Legislature. Durand improved the buildings, made an attractive flower garden. He was pious, industrious, and honest and a friend of the wayfarer.

Soon after the assassination of Joseph Smith, the Mormon prophet, two traveling Mormon preachers, greatly fatigued, were entertained for several days by Durand until they were able to resume their journey. Much later, after Durand's death, Mrs. Charles Earle had again made it an attractive home. A newspaper correspondent some years suggested the name "High Rock Villa" for the place, but nobody ever used it.

References

External links
  babel.hathitrust.org, retrieved 16th January, 2021

Geography of Bucks County, Pennsylvania